Etta is an Italian given name that is a diminutive form of Antonietta and Antonetta in use in Italy. It is also an English given name that is a short form of the name Henrietta. Etta is also a Danish, Finnish, Norwegian, Old Danish, Old Swedish and Swedish given name. Notable people with this name include the following:

Given name
Etta Baker (1913–2006), American musician
Etta Moten Barnett (1901–2004), American actress and singer
Etta Deikman (fl. 1950s –) American artist
Etta Zuber Falconer (1933–2002), American educator
Etta Federn (1883–1951), Austrian writer
Etta C. Gravely (born 1939), American chemistry academic
Etta Hulme (1923–2014), American cartoonist
Etta Jones (1928–2001), American singer
Etta Lee (1906–1956), American actress
Etta Belle Lloyd (1860–1929), American pioneer
Etta Wedell Mastbaum (1866–1953), American executive
Etta May, American comedian
Etta McDaniel (1890–1946), American actress
Etta Murfitt (born 1966), British dancer and choreographer 
Etta Neumann, Austrian table tennis player
Etta Palm d'Aelders (1743–1799), Dutch feminist
Etta D. Pisano, American radiologist
Etta Place (c. 1878 – ?), American Butch Cassidy's Wild Bunch associate
Etta Scollo (born 1958), Italian singer and songwriter
Etta Semple, birthname Martha Etta Donaldson, née Martha Etta Kilmer (1854–1914), American activist
Etta Angell Wheeler (1834–1921), American child advocate
Etta Wriedt (1859–1942), American medium

Nickname or stage name
Etta Banda (born 1949), Malawian politician
Etta Bond (born 1989), nickname of Henrietta Bond, British singer-songwriter
Etta Britt, birthname Melissa Prewitt, (born 1958/1959), American vocalist
Etta Cameron, birthname Ettamae Louvita Coakley, (1939–2010), Bahamian singer
Etta Hawkins, stage name of Henrietta Luna Hawkins (1865–1945), American actress
Etta James, birthname Jamesetta Hawkins (1938–2012), American singer 
Margaretta Louisa Lemon (1860–1953), British conservationist
Etta Haynie Maddox, (1860–1933), American vocalist, lawyer and suffragist
Etta Rosales (fl. 1998–2015), Filipino politician

Fictional characters
Etta Candy, Wonder Woman's best friend in the DC Comics universe
Etta, Gunslinger Girl character
Etta, Realm of the Elderlings character
Etta Kett (fl. 1925 – 1974), Comic strip (and comic strip character) focused on teenage etiquette
Etta Tavernier, EastEnders character played by Jacqui Gordon-Lawrence

See also

Eta (given name)
Amba Etta-Tawo (born 1993), Omani gridiron football player

Notes

Italian feminine given names